Lee Vining Airport  is a public use airport located one nautical mile (1.8 km) east of the central business district of Lee Vining, a town in Mono County, California, United States. The airport is owned by the City of Los Angeles.

Facilities and aircraft 
It has one asphalt paved runway which measures 4,090 by 50 feet (1,247 x 15 m). The apron measures 295 by 90 feet (90 x 27 m) and can usually accommodate six GA fixed-wing aircraft, near south end of the landing facility.

For the 12-month period ending October 6, 2008, the airport had 2,000 aircraft operations, an average of 166 per month, all of which were general aviation.

See also 
Mammoth Yosemite Airport (KMMH) (23.7 nm NW)

References

External links 
 Aerial photo as of 3 August 1999 from USGS The National Map

Airports in Mono County, California